Harpalus puetzi is a species of ground beetle in the subfamily Harpalinae. It was described by Kataev & Wrase in 1997.

References

puetzi
Beetles described in 1997